Kyle McClean (born 3 October 1998) is a Northern Irish professional footballer who plays as a midfielder for NIFL Premiership club Linfield. He has previously played for St Johnstone.

Career
McClean started his career in England at Nottingham Forest. After his release by Forest in the summer of 2017 he went on trial at St Johnstone. After a successful trial with the club, St Johnstone announced his signing on 5 June 2017 and he was named in the first team squad for the 2017–18 season. McClean made his league debut in November 2017, and extended his contract with St Johnstone by a year in December. McClean moved on loan to Linfield in January 2019. Upon his return to St Johnstone, he signed a new one-year contract. However, he left St Johnstone on 2 September 2019, with his contract being cancelled by mutual consent. He later re-signed permanently for Linfield in January 2020.

International career
McClean has represented Northern Ireland in youth internationals.

Career statistics

References

External links

1998 births
Living people
Association football midfielders
Nottingham Forest F.C. players
St Johnstone F.C. players
Linfield F.C. players
Scottish Professional Football League players
NIFL Premiership players
Association footballers from Northern Ireland
Association footballers from Belfast
Northern Ireland youth international footballers
Northern Ireland under-21 international footballers
Crusaders F.C. players